Bánffy is a Hungarian surname. Notable people with the surname include:

 Katalin Bánffy, 16th-century Hungarian noblewoman
 Dezső Bánffy (1843–1911), Hungarian politician
 Eszter Bánffy (born 1957), Hungarian prehistorian, archaeologist, and academic
 Miklós Bánffy (1873–1950), Hungarian nobleman, politician, and novelist

Hungarian-language surnames